Bali is a 1970 Italian romance film directed by Ugo Liberatore and Paolo Heusch.

Cast 

 John Steiner: Glenn 
 Laura Antonelli: Daria
 Umberto Orsini: Carlo 
 Petra Pauly: Brigitte 
 Johannes Schaaf: Bradford 
 Ettore Manni: Inspector (1975 version)
 Ilona Staller: Victim (1975 version)

Release
Bali was distributed by C.I.D.I.F. on 29 December 1970 in Italy. Originally directed by Ugo Liberatore and released as Incontro d'amore a Bali, it was a box office bomb. In 1975, following a series of commercial successes of Laura Antonelli, whose in the meanwhile had established herself as one of the most popular Italian sex symbols, the producer Alfredo Bini released a new version of the film, with a new editing and with the introduction of new scenes shot by Paolo Heusch with actors Ettore Manni and Ilona Staller.  Released  as Incontro d'amore, the film eventually got a large success at the Italian box office, grossing about 1 billion and a half lire.

See also    
 List of Italian films of 1970

References

External links

1970 films
1970 romantic drama films
Italian romantic drama films
Films directed by Paolo Heusch
Films set in Bali
1970s Italian films